Acrobasis aqualidella is a species of snout moth in the genus Acrobasis. It was described by Hugo Theodor Christoph in 1881.

References

Moths described in 1881
Acrobasis